Lancaster Airport was an airport about  northwest  of Lancaster, California.  It was closed in the late 1940s and is now a housing development.

History
The airport was established about 1929 as a municipal airport, operated by W. B. Carter.  The airport was said to have 2 dirt runways in an “L” shape: 2,250' east/west & 1,350' north/south. A hangar on the southeast corner was said to be marked with “Lancaster”.

On 28 July 1942 the airport was taken over by the United States Army Air Forces and used as a contract primary pilot training airfield under the AAF West Coast Training Center (later Western Flying Training Command).  The 3043d Army Air Force Base Unit administered the contract to a civilian operated primary flying school.  Training was performed with Fairchild PT-19s; several PT-17 Stearmans and a few P-40 Warhawks were assigned.   Royal Air Force and Royal Canadian Air Force personnel also trained at the airfield.

The contract training was replaced by Oxnard Army Airfield's primary school which moved to Lancaster on 27 June 1944. Conducted contract flying training until inactivated on 1 November 1945.

After the war the airport returned to general aviation operations until it closed about 1949. The land was redeveloped into suburban housing, although traces of the airport could be seen in aerial photography until about 1970.

See also

 California World War II Army Airfields

References

 Manning, Thomas A. (2005), History of Air Education and Training Command, 1942–2002.  Office of History and Research, Headquarters, AETC, Randolph AFB, Texas 
 Shaw, Frederick J. (2004), Locating Air Force Base Sites, History’s Legacy, Air Force History and Museums Program, United States Air Force, Washington DC.

External links
 (Original) Lancaster Airport, Lancaster, CA, Abandoned & Little-Known Airfields

Defunct airports in California
1929 establishments in California
USAAF Contract Flying School Airfields
Airfields of the United States Army Air Forces in California
History of Los Angeles County, California